Methylcyclohexene refers to any one of three organic compounds consisting of cyclohexene with a methyl group substituent. The location of the methyl group relative to the cyclohexene double bond creates the three different structural isomers. These compounds are generally used as a reagent or intermediate to derive other organic compounds. 

Methylcyclohexenes are a cyclic olefins. Cyclic olefins can come together to form polymers. These polymers are thermoplastics that are advantageous due to their low moisture intake, their ability to resist high temperatures, have low bireinfringence, and excellent transparency. This type of polymer material is very useful in medical instruments, packaging, fibers, and optics.

As simple molecules, methylcyclohexenes are generally available from different biochemical manufacturers.

Synthesis

There are different ways to produce methylcyclohexenes. A mixture of 1- and 2-methylcyclohexene can be produced by first reacting cyclohexanone with methylmagnesium bromide to 1-methylcyclohexanol, then dehydrating by heating in the presence of an acid or a base. This yields the methylcyclohexenes as the major products along with methylenecyclohexane as the minor product. 1-methylcyclohexene is dominant because of the more stable trisubstituted alkene structure. Although it is not preferred due to the high activation energy requirement, synthesis of 1-methylcyclohexene can also be done by Diels–Alder reaction.

Methylcyclohexene is also formed as a by-product in the hydrogenation of toluene to methylcyclohexane over ruthenium catalyst, which can lead to catalyst poisoning if the catalyst is insufficiently activated. Catalysts that have not been sufficiently hydrogenated prior to introduction of toluene will experience poisoning of active sites by methylcyclohexene, as the double bond adsorbs strongly to the catalyst surface.

Structure and bonding

The isomers of methylcyclohexene each contain a six carbon ring structure, with one carbon-carbon double bond within the ring and one methyl substituent on the ring. The bond lengths in 1-methylcyclohexene are approximately 1.33 Å between C1 (the carbon in the ring with the methyl substituent) and C2 (the second carbon of the double bond), 1.51 Å between C2 and C3 (the next carbon around the ring) and between C6 and C1, 1.54 Å between C3 and C4, between C4 and C5, and between C5 and C6, and 1.50 Å between C1 and the carbon of the methyl substituent.  The bond lengths of the other isomers of methylcyclohexene vary slightly from 1-methylcyclohexene, due to the different position of the double bond with respect to the methyl substituent.

Reactions

Ozonolysis
As an unsaturated molecule, methylcyclohexene can undergo oxidation with several oxidizing agents, including the strong oxidizing agent ozone, undergoing ozonolysis to release either atomic oxygen or a hydroxyl radical. Its reactivity towards ozone makes it an atmospheric pollutant, as it contributes to ozone depletion by trapping the oxygen atoms into its end products as carbonyl compounds.

Hydrosilyation

The regioselectivity and stereoselectivity of hydrosilylation of 1-methylcyclohexene with chloro(methyl)silanes depends on the number of chlorine atoms in the hydrosilylating agent. Using chlorodimethylsilane produces a mixture of seven different products including cis- and trans-isomers of 2-, 3-, 4-chlorodimethyl(methylcyclohexyl)silanes and chlorodimethyl(cyclohexylmethyl)silane. The poor selectivity is due to the migration of the double bond in the cyclohexene ring. Reaction with dichloromethylsilane is more regioselective and stereoselective, only giving three of the seven products obtained from monochlorodimethylsilane. With trichloromethylsilane, trichlorocyclohexylmethylsilane is the only possible product and is obtained at 60 percent yield. All these products can be further reacted with Grignard reagents such as ethynylmagnesium bromide to synthesize ethynyl derivatives.

Oxidation with Cytochrome P450
1-methylcyclohexene can be oxidized with a Cytochrome P450 catalyst. The ratioof hydroxylation products to epoxidation products was shown to be 2:1.

Bromination

In the presence of a Cinchona alkaloid, bromination of an alkene leads to optically active dibromides. For 4-methylcyclohexene, the (S)-configuration leads to two different products: the bromines can add at the axial positions, giving the orientation (1S:3R:4R), or at the equatorial positions, giving the orientation (1S:3S:4S). Similarly, the (R)-configuration produces two different products: axial addition yields the configuration (1R:3S:4S) and equatorial addition yields (1R:3R:4R).

References

Cyclohexenes